Leo Christopher Byrne (March 19, 1908 – October 21, 1974) served as the Roman Catholic Coadjutor Archbishop of the Roman Catholic Archdiocese of Saint Paul and Minneapolis, in Minneapolis-Saint Paul, Minnesota.

Biography
Born in Saint Louis, Missouri, Byrne was ordained to the Roman Catholic priesthood on June 10, 1933, for the Roman Catholic Archdiocese of Saint Louis. On May 21, 1954, Pope Pius XII appointed Byrne auxiliary bishop of the Roman Catholic Archdiocese of Saint Louis, and he was consecrated on June 29, 1954.

On February 11, 1961, Pope John XXIII appointed Bishop Byrne the coadjutor bishop of the Roman Catholic Diocese of Wichita, in Wichita, Kansas.

Pope Paul VI appointed Bishop Byrne coadjutor archbishop of the Saint Paul-Minneapolis Archdiocese on July 31, 1967, where he died before becoming ordinary of the archdiocese.

Notes

1908 births
1974 deaths
20th-century Roman Catholic archbishops in the United States
Roman Catholic archbishops of Saint Paul and Minneapolis
Participants in the Second Vatican Council
Roman Catholic Archdiocese of St. Louis
Clergy from St. Louis
Religious leaders from Minnesota
People from Wichita, Kansas
Roman Catholic bishops of Wichita
Religious leaders from Missouri